The Fox may refer to:

Film
 The Fox (1921 film), a silent Western starring Harry Carey
 The Fox (1967 film), a Canadian drama directed by Mark Rydell

Music

Albums
 The Fox (Elton John album), 1981
 The Fox (Harold Land album), 1960
 The Fox (Urbie Green album), 1976
 The Fox, a 1985 album by José Fors
The Fox, soundtrack album by Lalo Schifrin, 1968

Songs
"The Fox", an art song by Peter Warlock to a poem by Bruce Blunt, 1930
 "The Fox" (folk song), a 15th-century folk song popular in modern bluegrass
 "The Fox", a song from Steeleye Span's 1989 album Tempted and Tried
 "The Fox", a song from Sleater-Kinney's 2005 album The Woods
 "The Fox (What Does the Fox Say?)", a 2013 song and viral video made by the Norwegian duo Ylvis

People
 Eric Carr (1950–1991), American musician
 Eddie "Lockjaw" Davis (1922–1986), American jazz saxophonist
 Malcolm Fairley (born 1952), British criminal
 Sakae Oba (1914–1992), Japanese holdout on the island of Saipan, surrendered in December 1945
 James F. Phillips (1930–2001), American environmental activist and schoolteacher
 Fred Snowden (1936–1994), American collegiate basketball coach

Publications

Novels
The Fox (Forsyth novel), a 2018 novel by Frederick Forsyth
The Fox (novella), a 1922 novella by D. H. Lawrence
The Fox (Smith novel), a 2007 novel by Sherwood Smith

Others
 T.H.E. Fox, an online comic of the 1980s and 1990s by Joe Ekaitis
The Fox (magazine), a 1970s conceptual art magazine
Volpone, a 1606 play by Ben Jonson, subtitled The Fox

Pubs
The Fox Goes Free, pub in Charlton, West Sussex, England, formerly The Fox
The Fox Inn, Hanwell, pub in London, England
The Fox, York, pub in Yorkshire, England

Other uses
The Fox: NGV Contemporary, a new art gallery, part of the National Gallery of Victoria in Melbourne, Australia

See also 
 Fox (disambiguation)